Heriberto Ambrosio Cipriano (born 16 March 1968) is a Mexican politician from the Institutional Revolutionary Party. From 2009 to 2012 he served as Deputy of the LXI Legislature of the Mexican Congress representing Oaxaca.

References

1968 births
Living people
Politicians from Oaxaca
Institutional Revolutionary Party politicians
21st-century Mexican politicians
Benito Juárez Autonomous University of Oaxaca alumni
Members of the Congress of Oaxaca
20th-century Mexican politicians
Deputies of the LXI Legislature of Mexico
Members of the Chamber of Deputies (Mexico) for Oaxaca